Magrudergrind is an American grindcore band formed in 2002. They have released numerous splits and three full-length albums. Since its inception the band has toured Europe and North America multiple times, Puerto Rico, Japan, and South East Asia, along with Exhumed, Despise You, Misery Index, Unholy Grave, Phobia and Rotten Sound.

Biography
In 2007, Magrudergrind released their first full length, Rehashed, on Six Weeks Records. In 2009, Magrudergrind's second full-length, self-titled record was released on Willowtip Records, engineered by Kurt Ballou (Converge, Misery Index, Torche) and mastered by Scott Hull (Pig Destroyer, Phobia). During 2010, Magrudergrind appeared at the Scion Rock Festival in Ohio in March, the Maryland Deathfest, Memorial Day weekend and Hellfest in Clisson, France in June 2010. Magrudergrind also appeared at the SXSW Music Festival in Austin, Texas, and European metal festivals in the Netherlands, Portugal and Czech Republic, including the Obscene Extreme festival.

In 2010, Magrudergrind released the Crusher EP on Scion Audio/Visual in America and on Bones Brigade Records and RSR in Europe. In 2012 this was re-released on To Live A Lie Records in the United States.

In 2012, they appeared in an episode of Veep titled "Nicknames". They performed onstage and were described as an extreme metal band. In February 2015, the band signed to Relapse Records, and announced that they planned to release another full-length at the end of 2015. The album, II was released in 2016.

Members
Current Members
 Avi Kulawy - vocals (2002–present)
 R.J. Ober - guitar (2007–present)
 Casey Moore - drums (2013–present)

Former members
 Marc Levin - guitar (2002-2005)
 Chris Moore - drums (2002-2013)
 Mourice Alvarado - guitar, vocals (2005-2007)

Timeline

Discography

Albums
 Religious Baffle (2003, self-released)
 Don't Support Humanitary Aid Led by the Church (2003, self-released)
 Sixty Two Trax of Thrash 2002–2005 (2005, Torture Garden Picture Company/To Live A Lie Records/Death, Agony & Screams Records)
 Rehashed (2007, Six Weeks)
 Magrudergrind (2009, Willowtip Records)
 II (2016, Relapse Records)

EPs
 Owned! 7-inch (2004, Punks Before Profits Records)
 Crusher CD/10" (2010, Scion Audio/Visual/Bones Brigade/Kaotoxin/To Live A Lie)

Splits
 split 7-inch with Vomit Spawn (2004, Militant Records)
 split tape with Akkolyte (2004, Death, Agony, & Screams Records)
 split 7-inch with A Warm Gun (2005, McCarthyism Records/Misfire Records)
 split 7-inch with Godstomper (2005, Nuclear BBQ Party Records/To Live A Lie Records)
 split 7-inch with Sanitys Dawn (2005, Regurgitated Semen Records)
 split 7-inch with Sylvester Staline (2006, Bones Brigade Records)
 split CD/LP with Shitstorm (2006, Robotic Empire Records)

References

External links
Magrudergrind on Myspace

American grindcore musical groups
Powerviolence groups
American musical trios
Heavy metal musical groups from Washington, D.C.